The Arado SC I was a biplane trainer developed in Germany in the 1920s. It was based on the S I, but powered by a far more powerful inline engine. Accordingly, the structure received considerable strengthening. The aircraft was intended for the clandestine military flying school at Lipetsk, but it was not accepted for this service. Instead, a small number were built for the Deutsche Verkehrsfliegerschule.

Specifications

See also

References

 
 World Aircraft Information Files. Brightstar Publishing, London. File 889 Sheet 73
 German Aircraft between 1919 – 1945

Biplanes
Single-engined tractor aircraft
1920s German civil trainer aircraft
SC I